"Baby It's Christmas" is a song recorded by British girl group Bananarama, released on 13 December 2010 as a digital EP in the UK and most European territories. It debuted on the UK Singles Chart at number#199. The song reached #19 in the UK Indie Chart.

Song information

The song is Bananarama's first Christmas record, excluding their contribution to "Do They Know It's Christmas?". It is an original Christmas song written by group member Sara Dallin and producer Ian Masterson.

The song was originally only planned to be included on a USA digital compilation album Super Dance Christmas Party Vol.3, released in November 2010. However, the group and producer Ian Masterson were pleased with the track, thus decided to make it available to purchase by download in the UK and Europe. The song was released digitally on 13 December 2010 without any record label support. Remixes by production team Almighty were issued for the occasion.

It is Bananarama's first song not to be released in a physical format.

Formats
Across the UK and some European territories, the song is available in two different bundles while in America and Canada both Radio Edit and Extended Mix are individually available as part of the Super Dance Christmas Party Vol.3 compilation.

 "Baby It's Christmas" 
"Baby It's Christmas" (Radio Edit) (S. Dallin/I. Masterson)
"Baby It's Christmas" (Extended Mix) (S. Dallin/I. Masterson)

 "Baby It's Christmas" - The Remixes 
"Baby It's Christmas" (Almighty Radio Edit) (S. Dallin/I. Masterson)
"Baby It's Christmas" (Almighty Dub) (S. Dallin/I. Masterson)
"Baby It's Christmas" (Almighty Club Mix) (S. Dallin/I. Masterson)

References

2010 singles
Bananarama songs
Songs written by Sara Dallin
Songs written by Ian Masterson
Song recordings produced by Ian Masterson
2010 songs